Dåsnesmoen or Dåsnesmonen is a village in Evje og Hornnes municipality in Agder county, Norway. The village is located on the west shore of the river Otra, north of the villages of Hornnes and Kjetså and southwest of the village of Evje. The Norwegian National Road 9 runs through the village.

References

Villages in Agder
Evje og Hornnes